This is the discography of Taiwanese Mandopop artist Show Lo. From 1996 to 1998, he was part of a quartet boy band Four Heavenly Kings (四大天王), releasing five albums. Then in 1998, after two members left, he formed a duo Romeo (羅密歐), with Ou Han Sheng (歐漢聲); the other member of Four Heavenly Kings, released two albums and was active till 2000. In 2003, he debuted as a solo artist with the release of Show Time. He has since released eleven Mandarin studio, one Japanese studio, three compilation, one remix and three concert DVD albums.

On 13 December 2010, Luo's seventh studio album Rashomon was certificated by Recording Industry Foundation in Taiwan (RIT) for sales of 154,218 copies in Taiwan, for audit period of 15 January to 30 September 2010, thus a certification of five platinums and the best selling album in Taiwan of 2010.

Albums

Studio (Solo)

Compilation

Remix

Group (Disbanded)
 1996 - Four Heavenly Kings - 1st Ha Ha Dance Floor (恰恰舞池)
 1997 - Four Heavenly Kings - 2nd (嘿哪喔啊嘉年華)
 1997 - Four Heavenly Kings - 3rd I Like (我喜歡)
 1998 - Four Heavenly Kings - 4th Sweetie (甜蜜蜜)
 1998 - Four Heavenly Kings - 5th I Like To Call You Babe compilation album (我就是要叫你寶貝精選輯)
 1999 - Romeo - 1st (貓叫春)
 2000 - Romeo - 2nd (動起來)

Japanese Discography

Singles

Studio

Concert DVD

Other Concert DVD

Soundtrack contributions
 2000 The Youth Of Liang Shanbo & Zhu Yintai OST (新梁山伯與祝英台 aka 少年梁祝) - "錦繡陽關道"
 2000 The Youth Of Liang Shanbo & Zhu Yintai OST (新梁山伯與祝英台 aka 少年梁祝) - "拜訪我的愛"
 2003 Show Time - "妳說妳的我說我的" (You Said It's Yours I Say It's Mine) - Hi Working Girl (Hi！上班女郎) ending theme
 2004 Expert Show - "灰色空間" (Grey Dimension) - Outsiders II (鬥魚2) ending theme
 2006 Speshow - "愛＊轉角" (Love＊Corner) - Corner With Love ending theme
 2006 Speshow - "幾分" (How Many Points) - Corner With Love insert song
 2007 High School Musical 2 Special Edition (歌舞青春 2 亞洲豪華超值版) - "Bet On It" ("必殺技") - Mandarin version
 2008 Trendy Man - "箇中強手" (Best Of The Bunch) - Hot Shot  opening theme
 2008 Trendy Man - "幸福不滅" (Cause I Believe) - Hot Shot  insert song
 2010 Rashomon - "生理時鐘" (Biological Clock) - Hi My Sweetheart insert song
 2010 Rashomon - "愛瘋頭" (Head Over Heels) - Hi My Sweetheart opening theme
 2010 Rashomon - "愛不單行" (You Won't Be Alone) - Hi My Sweetheart insert song
 2010 Rashomon - "In Your Eyes" - feat Rainie Yang - Hi My Sweetheart insert song

Collaboration

Song and Music Video
 Expert Show - "戀愛達人" (Love Expert) - feat Dee Shu
 Expert Show - "一起走吧" (Let's Go) - feat Energy
 Hypnosis Show - "真命天子" (Destined Guy) - feat. Jolin Tsai
 2006 - Jump Up – 9492 (Joey Yung) - "飆汗" (Sweating) - feat Show Lo
 Speshow - "Twinkle" - feat Kumi Koda (倖田來未)
 Speshow - "國王遊戲" (King's Game) - feat Simon Webbe (song only)
 Show Your Dance - "敗給你" (Lost To You) - feat Elva Hsiao
 Rashomon - "Wow!"  - feat Elva Hsiao
 Rashomon - "In Your Eyes" - feat Rainie Yang

Music Video
 2001 天天說愛我 (Makiyo 川島茉樹代) - "越來越遠" - feat Show Lo & Blackie
 Show Time - "沒有妳" (Without You) - feat Terri Kwan (關穎) & Jerry Huang (黃志瑋) from Show Lo Music Love Story
 Show Time - "這一秒我哭了" (In This Second I Cried) - feat Terri Kwan Jerry Huang from Show Lo Music Love Story
 Expert Show - "小丑魚" (Clown Fish) - feat Rainie Yang
 2004 - Tiao Xin (Shin) - "挑釁" - feat Show Lo - he plays a photographer who goes blind
 Hypnosis Show - "自我催眠" (Self-Hypnosis) - feat Barbie Shu
 Hypnosis Show - "嗆司嗆司" (Chance Chance) - feat Maggie Wu and cameo by Luo MaMa (Show's mother)
 2005 Luminary (He Jie) - "希望" (Hope) - feat Show Lo
 Speshow - "好朋友" (Good Friends) - feat Ariel Lin
 Show Your Dance - "我不會唱歌" (I Don't Know How To Sing) - feat Karena Lam
 Trendy Man - "撐腰" (Waist Support) - guest appearance by Party Boys, Da S, Xiao S, Jolin Tsai, Blackie/Hei Ren, Da Mu, Gua Ge, Xian Ge, Chai Zhi Ping, Lin He Long and Luo MaMa
 Trendy Man - "搞笑" (Making Jokes) - feat Alice Tzeng
 Only for You - "Touch My Heart" - feat Ivy Chen
 2011 - Sticky (Cyndi Wang) - "陪我到以後" - feat Show Lo

Other songs
 2008 - "用愛點亮希望" - 音樂之聲 (Love and Hope) - Sound of Music I Want To Go To School (我要上學) campaign theme song
 2010 - "小事變樂事" (Small Pleasures) - Lays Max potato chips advert theme song (樂事MAX波樂洋芋片)

References

External links
  Show Lo discography@Avex Taiwan (2003–2007)
  Show Lo Gold Typhoon homepage (2007–present) formerly EMI Music Taiwan

Discographies of Taiwanese artists
Mandopop discographies